Helan County (Xiao'erjing: حَ‌لًا ثِيًا) is a county of Ningxia Hui Autonomous Region, China, it is under the administration of the prefecture-level city of Yinchuan, the capital of Ningxia, and borders Inner Mongolia to the northwest.

Characteristics

Helan County has developed industry in recent years; its newly developed industrial area is in the northern suburbs of Yinchuan, about eight kilometers from the city center. This industrial area provides employment for residents of the county, and promotes agricultural development. The county government is located in the town of Xigang, and the county's postal code is 750200.

Geography

The Yellow River flows through Helan county from the southeast to the northeast. In total, 21.25 kilometers of the river flows through the county. The quality of the river water is very high, and it is used for irrigation in the county.

The western part of the county is home to the Helan Mountains.

Climate

Helan County belongs to the mainland climate region. Winters are long and cold, and summers are quite wet. Spring and Fall are relatively short. Daily temperatures are highly variable, changing by an average of 10 degrees Celsius (20 °F) each day. Due to the large variety of topography in the county, regional climates also vary considerably. Notably, winter in the Helan Mountains region can last up to 10 months out of every year.

There is relatively little rainfall in Helan County, with an average of  each year. Daylight hours are long, totaling an average of 66% of each year.

Administrative divisions
Helan County has 4 towns  1 township and 2 other.
4 towns
 Xigang
 Hongguang
 Ligang
 Jingui

1 township
 Changxin

2 other
 Nuanquan Farm
 Nanliang Taizi Administration Committee

Economy

On the flood plains of the Yellow River, agriculture is the primary form of industry. Forestry is an important industry in the shade of the Helan Mountains.

References

County-level divisions of Ningxia
Yinchuan